Nancy Johnson (born 1935) is an American politician.

Nancy Johnson may also refer to:
Nancy Johnson (sport shooter) (born 1974), American sports shooter
Nancy Maria Donaldson Johnson (1794–1890)
Nancey Jackson Johnson (born 1968), American gospel musician
Nancy Johnson, character in The OA